TBOX or Tbox may refer to

Computing
 TBox and ABox, terminology and assertion statements in knowledge bases
TBOX, a multi-platform c library in computing

Other uses
Railbox, a railroad company with several reporting marks, including TBOX
Tbox, another name for a bush bass, a musical instrument
 TBOX, an acronym for The Twelve Bars of Christmas, a Chicago pub crawl

See also
 T-box, transcription factors involved in limb and heart development
 T-box leader, a riboswitch involved in sensing tRNA aminoacylation